Buckminster Fuller is an EP by Jersey-born singer-songwriter Nerina Pallot, released on 13 February 2009 as an exclusive CD for her fans that were attending the "flurry of gigs" in February 2009. Nerina played in Holmfirth, Buxton, London and Exeter.

Track listings

Original release

External links 

2009 debut EPs
Nerina Pallot albums